Aguadilla, founded in 1775 by Luis de Córdova, is a city and municipality located in the northwestern tip of Puerto Rico, bordered by the Atlantic Ocean to the north and west, north of Aguada, and Moca and west of Isabela. Aguadilla is spread over 15 barrios and Aguadilla Pueblo (the downtown area and the administrative center of the city). It is a principal city and core of the Aguadilla-Isabela-San Sebastián Metropolitan Statistical Area.

Etymology and nicknames 

Aguadilla is a shortening of the town's original name San Carlos de La Aguadilla. The name Aguadilla is a diminutive of Aguada, which is the name of the town and municipality located to the south. Some of the municipality's nicknames are: Jardín del Atlántico ("Garden of the Atlantic"), Pueblo de los Tiburones ("Shark Town") and La Villa del Ojo de Agua ("Villa of the Water Spring") after the natural water spring that was used by early settlers and Spanish soldiers as a water source which is now located in El Parterre Square in Aguadilla Pueblo.

History
According to sources, a Taíno settlement called Aymamón was located close to the Culebrinas River.

The present territory of Aguadilla was originally part of the territory of Aguada. In 1775, the foundation of Aguadilla by Don Luis de Córdova was approved. But it wasn't until 1780 that the territory was properly segregated, making the founding of the town official. Originally, Aguadilla was constituted by the Victoria and Higüey barrios. This region was already inhabited and known as Aguadilla before 1770. In 1776, Fray Íñigo Abbad y Lasierra in his description of the towns of the island, mentioned it as the "new Town of San Carlos de La Aguadilla." Nevertheless, according to Dr. Agustín Stahl in his Foundation of Aguadilla, it was not until 1780 that the town was officially founded. The construction of a new church and the proceedings to become an independent village began in 1775.

The population in the Village of Aguadilla continued to increase constantly mainly due to its excellent port and strategic location in the route of the boats. In 1776, when Santo Domingo became independent for the first time, the loyalists of Spanish descent emigrated to Puerto Rico, mainly to Aguadilla, which caused the population to continue increasing significantly. In 1831, according to Don Pedro Tomás de Córdova, the area or "party" of Aguadilla belonged to Aguada. At this time, the territorial organization of Aguadilla was as follows: Pueblo Norte (North Town), Pueblo Sur (South Town), Ceiba Alta, Ceiba Baja, Montaña, Malezas, Aguacate, Dos Palmas, Camaseyes, Plainela, Borinquen, Arenales, Higüey, Corrales, Victoria, and Mangual.

Don Pedro Tomás de Córdova mentions the road of Aguadilla formed by Punta Borinquen and San Francisco, as the "anchorage of the ships that travel from Europe to Havana and Mexico". He adds that its "port is the most frequented in the Island due to the proportions that it offers to refresh all class of ship."

In 1860, Aguadilla was officially declared a village. Several years later, when the island was territorially organized into seven departments, Aguadilla became the head of the third department that included the municipalities of Aguada, Isabela, Lares, Moca, Rincón, and San Sebastián. In January 1841 a Royal Order transferred the judicial party from Aguada to Aguadilla. In 1878, according to Don Manuel Ebeda y Delgado, the territorial organization of Aguadilla had varied a little. At this time Plainela, Higüey, and Mangual barrios are not mentioned. The Dos Palmas barrio appears as Palmar. Also at this time, three new barrios are mentioned: Guerrero, Caimital Alto, and Caimital Bajo. In 1898, even with the change of sovereignty in the island, the territorial organization of Aguadilla is the same to that of 1878. Nevertheless, in the Census of 1899, downtown Aguadilla appears constituted by Higüey, Iglesia, Nueva, Santa Barbara, and Tamarindo barrios. Malezas barrio appears subdivided into Maleza Alta and Maleza Baja. From that time, the territorial organization of Aguadilla did not change, until 1948, when the Puerto Rico Department of Planning prepared the map of the city and its barrios, and following instructions of city authorities, Higüey and parts of Caimital Alto barrios are annexed to Downtown Aguadilla.

Ramey Air Force Base

Aguadilla was the site of the U.S. military's Ramey Air Force Base for almost five decades. During this period, Aguadilla was home to the Strategic Air Command, equipped with RB-36s and 72d Bombardment Wing, Heavy equipped with B-52s, an important strategic facility during the Cold War.
Activated in June 1952 as a Strategic Air Command very long-range reconnaissance unit at Ramey AFB, Puerto Rico, but not operational until October 1952. Redesignated as 72d Strategic Reconnaissance Wing and received 3 (60th, 73rd and 301st) squadrons of RB-36D/E/F/H Peacemaker bombers. Also, the 915th Air Rescue Squadron. Conducted global strategic reconnaissance 1953–1955, gradually shifting to a bombardment training mission beginning in 1954, being upgraded to B-36J and B-36J(III) Featherweights by 1955. Redesignated 72d Bombardment Wing in 1958. 
With the phaseout of the B-36s in 1958, received B-52G Stratofortress intercontinental strategic bombers.

Though the infrastructure still exists, the airport was handed over to the Government of Puerto Rico in 1973. The aerial facilities are now controlled by the Puerto Rico Ports Authority and comprise the Rafael Hernández International Airport. The barracks now host the Faro Inn Suites, a 79-room hotel. The Officer's Club now hosts the Faro Conference Center, a  meeting facility. The hospital is now the Courtyard by Marriott Punta Borinquen Resort & Casino, a 150-room hotel with a casino and the first Marriott in Puerto Rico outside of the San Juan Metropolitan Area.

Ramey also hosts the University of Puerto Rico at Aguadilla and the Friedrich Froebel Bilingual School (K-9). The high school became Ramey Job Corps Campus and the elementary school became the Esther Feliciano Mendoza Middle School. Centro de Adiestramiento y Bellas Artes (CABA) since 1979 has been the only public school of arts in Puerto Rico (7–12). Ramey is also the site of the new Ramey Skating Park and a new mariposario (butterfly farm) and the Ramey Shopping Center.

There is still an active part of the base that hosts the Coast Guard Borinquen Air Station. There are also other government agencies based at Ramey, including the United States Department of Homeland Security, U.S. Customs & Border Protection's Office of Air and Marine and Office of Border Patrol, the Fuerzas Unidas de Rápida Acción (United Forces for Rapid Action) of the Puerto Rico Police Department and the Puerto Rico National Guard.

There is also a post office, the Centro de Servicios al Conductor (Driver's Services Center), a bakery, and a Banco Popular de Puerto Rico location.

San Antonio

San Antonio village was established in the mid-19th century. It was populated by 60 families. Originally the place where these families were located was known as Bajura de Vadi, the place later to become known as San Antonio.

In 1918, as a consequence of the 1918 San Fermín earthquake, the village was completely destroyed by a tsunami. The families suffered the struggles caused by this natural disaster due by the proximity of the village to the shore.

The residents of the village decided re-localize the village in a higher area further from shore. The new location was what today is known as Ramey.

The village's infrastructure started its evolution. Luis R. Esteves and Juan Garcia established the first two theaters in the area. A new was social club form, known as "Luz del Porvenir" (Light of the Future). There was also a new bakery and a post office, among other facilities. At this time, the village also began its Patron Festival.

The clothing industry was a major source of employment.

In September 1939, some  covered by sugar cane, was expropriated for the military at the cost of $1,215,000, in order to build an air base that came to be known as Ramey Air Force Base.

Since the foundation, the village has suffered three expropriations as a result of expansions to Ramey Air Force Base. These expropriations delayed and ended the plans to turn San Antonio into a town.

Today, the population of San Antonio consists of approximately ten thousand people. It has a modern square, a Puerto Rico State Police Station, a coliseum, an industrial park, public housing, a baseball park, a public school system, shops, and many other characteristics of a small town. The town also has a flag and an emblem. Roberto Román Acevedo designed the town flag and emblem.

Tragedy on election day in 1944

On the early morning hours of November 7, 1944, Puerto Rico suffered the worst railroad accident in its history. Train No. 3 was traveling from San Juan to Ponce carrying passengers to their different hometowns for the island general elections to be held that same day. It stopped at the Jiménez Station in Aguadilla for a routine engineer and boilerman exchange with Train No. 4 which was heading to San Juan. The engineer assigned to Train No. 3's ride from Jiménez Station to Ponce was José Antonio Román, an experienced freight train engineer who had never worked in passenger travel. When the train left the station at 2:00 am, it was carrying 6 passenger cars with hundreds of commuters and two freight cars.

At 2:20 a.m. the train started to descend a hill section known as Cuesta Vieja (Old Hill) in Aguadilla at, what some witnesses described as, an exaggerated speed. When the train reached the leveling-off point at the bottom of the hill it derailed. The steam locomotive crashed into a ditch where it exploded and one of the freight cars crashed into one of the passenger cars, killing many inside. Witnesses described the scene as horrendous, with some accounts stating that parents were throwing their children out the windows to save them from the wreckage. Chief of Police Guillermo Arroyo stated that the locomotive (No. 72), the express car, and three second class passenger cars were completely destroyed. Oscar Valle, an Aguadilla correspondent to El Mundo newspaper, summarized the scene with: "The locomotive suffered a terrible explosion as it derailed, and the impact was so strong that 3 passenger cars were converted into a fantastic mound of wreckage". In the end, 16 passengers lost their lives, including the engineer and the boilerman, and 50 were injured in the crash.

Hurricane Maria

Hurricane Maria struck Puerto Rico on September 20, 2017, causing large-scale damage and destruction to infrastructure. In Aguadilla 10 inches of rain were recorded and its more than 54,000 residents were left with no electrical power.

The four radar systems used by the Federal Aviation Administration for flights in and around Puerto Rico were damaged by Hurricane Maria, and it took nearly two weeks to fix them. One of the radar systems is located in Aguadilla.

Geography
Aguadilla is located in the northwest coast of the island of Puerto Rico, in the Western Coastal Plains. It is bordered by the Atlantic Ocean in the north, the municipalities of Isabela on the east, and Moca and Aguada in the south.

The area of the municipality is 35.5 square miles. It is mostly plain, with some notable hills being Jiménez (728 feet) and Viñet (689 feet). It has only one river, the Culebrinas, which separates Aguadilla from Aguada. Also, Cedro Creek which separates Aguadilla from Isabela in the north.

Barrios

Like all municipalities of Puerto Rico, Aguadilla is subdivided into barrios.

 Aguacate
 Aguadilla barrio-pueblo
 Arenales
 Borinquen
 Caimital Alto
 Caimital Bajo
 Camaceyes
 Ceiba Alta
 Ceiba Baja
 Corrales
 Guerrero
 Maleza Alta
 Maleza Baja
 Montaña
 Palmar
 Victoria

Sectors

Barrios (which are roughly comparable to minor civil divisions) in turn are further subdivided into smaller local populated place areas/units called sectores (which means sectors in English). The types of sectores may vary, from normally sector to urbanización to reparto to barriada to residencial, among others.

Special Communities

 (Special Communities of Puerto Rico) are marginalized communities whose citizens are experiencing a certain amount of social exclusion. A map shows these communities occur in nearly every municipality of the commonwealth.

Temperature of sea

Economy

The city is currently home to a variety of industrial and pharmaceutical plants such sa LifeScan, Symmetricom, Honeywell, and Hewlett Packard Enterprise. Most of them are located at San Antonio Technological Park. The airport has Lufthansa Technik, while others like Suiza Dairy, Lockheed Martin and Productos La Aguadillana are located in Camaseyes Industrial Park. Other industries that are based in Aguadilla are rubber, plastics, leather, textiles, steel, wood, machinery, and food processing.

The retail sector is another source of economy in Aguadilla. Shopping malls like Aguadilla Mall, Aguadilla Shopping Center, Aguadilla Town Center, and others are some of the main commercial and retail centers of the city.

In 2019, Aguadilla received the City Livability Award from the United States Conference of Mayors and honored the efforts spearheaded by Carlos Méndez Martínez. Specifically mentioned was "Pintalto", a project where Cerro Cabrero area, in the downtown area of Aguadilla was painted in rich, lively colors.

Tourism

Aguadilla is part of the Porta del Sol touristic region in Puerto Rico. The Porta del Sol website highlights Aguadilla's beaches for surfing.

According to the Puerto Rico Department of Natural and Environmental Resources, Aguadilla has the most beaches on the island, with nineteen in total. Some of the beaches are considered among the best for surfing, like Surfer's Beach, Gas Chambers, Crash Boat, Wilderness, among others. Because of this, Aguadilla has served as host to surfing competitions, like the ISA World Championship in 1988.

Other attractions of the town are Las Cascadas Water Park and the Aguadilla Ice Skating Arena, which is the only ice skating complex in the Caribbean.

Landmarks and places of interest 
There are nine places in Aguadilla listed on the US National Register of Historic Places:
 Old Urban Cemetery
 
 District Courthouse (Aguadilla, Puerto Rico)
 
 Punta Borinquen Light
 
  – Church San Carlos Borromeo 
 Cardona Residence
 López Residence

Other places of interest in Aguadilla include:

 Aguadilla City Hall – originally built in 1918. Reconstructed after the 1918 earthquake.
 Banyan Treehouse – wooden house around a banyan tree (none of its parts touch the tree)
 , a fountain
 Christopher Columbus Monument – a monument which consists of a cross originally made of marble, and had to be rebuilt after the earthquake.
 , a park
 
 Fisherman's Monument
 , a square
  (The Waterfalls) Water Park (Closed after Hurricane Maria in 2017) 
 Old Sugar Pier of Aguadilla
 
 Punta Borinquen Golf Course – an 18-hole golf course, originally built for President Dwight D. Eisenhower.
 Punta Borinquen Lighthouse and ruins
 Rafael Hernández Monument
 Rafael Hernández Square
 Ramey Skate Park, a skatepark at the Ramey Military Base
 Youth Fountain at  Park

To stimulate local tourism during the COVID-19 pandemic in Puerto Rico, the Puerto Rico Tourism Company launched the Voy Turistiendo ("I'm Touring") campaign in 2021. The campaign featured a passport book with a page for each municipality. The  Aguadilla passport page lists Crash Boat Beach, Survival Beach, Rompeolas Beach, and Peña Blanca Beach as places of interest for locals.

Beaches 

There are 32 beaches in Aguadilla. Some of the more well-known beaches include:
 Balneario Municipal de Aguadilla (GNIS ID 1990599)
 Playa La Ruina (GNIS ID 1991881) also called Wilderness Beach or Las Ruinas ("The Ruins" in English)
 Playa Punta Borinquen (GNIS ID 1991891)
 Crash Boat Beach
 Survival Beach
 Surfer's Beach
 Rompeolas Beach / Rompeolas Beach North also known as

Culture

Festivals and events
Aguadilla celebrates its patron saint festival in October. The  is a religious and cultural celebration that generally features parades, games, artisans, amusement rides, regional food, and live entertainment.

Other festivals and events celebrated in Aguadilla include:
 Velorio de Reyes – Celebrated mostly in January, they are a religious ceremony held as gratitude to the Three Kings for some answered prayer. They usually consist of hymns, prayers, and other religious expressions.
 Kite Festival – Held in April, it includes kiosks, music, and kite flying.
 Fiestas San Antonio – April
 Verbena de Corrales – May
 Beach Festival – June
 Festival del Atún – Celebrated in July, it is a festival dedicated to the fishing of the tuna.
 Festival de la Música – July

Sports
Aguadilla is home to several professional and amateur sports teams. The most notable are the Aguadilla Divas of the Female Superior Volleyball League, and the Aguadilla Sharks of the Superior Baseball League (Double-A). The Divas play their home games in the Luis T. Díaz Coliseum in Downtown Aguadilla from January to March, while the Sharks play their home games at Luis A. Canena Márquez Stadium from February to May.

Aguadilla also had a professional basketball team called the Aguadilla Sharks, that played for the BSN league. This team was merged into the Cangrejeros de Santurce in 1998.

Aguadilla is also a place where many famous baseball players originate from. There are plans for a future ECHL Minor League Hockey franchise for the city.

Communication

Radio
 WABA WABA La Grande 850AM is located in Aguadilla.
 WWNA better known as Radio Una 1340AM is located in Aguadilla.
 WVOZ WAPA Radio frequency 1580AM is located in Aguadilla.

Television
 WOLE-TV 12.
 WELU is a religious broadcast company.
 WSJP-LD CW 18 is a CW Television Network affiliated station.

Demographics

The 1887 census conducted by Spain showed Aguadilla had a population of 16,140.

According to the US 2010 Census, there were 60,949 people in the city. This represents a decrease of more than 3,000 from the 2000 Census. The 2020 Census indicated the municipality has 55,101 residents representing a decline of over 5,000 residents.

As a whole, Puerto Rico is populated mainly by people from Creole or Spanish and European descent. Statistics taken from the 2000 census shows that 83.6% of Aguadillanos identify as having Spanish or white origin, 5.0% are black, 0.2% are Amerindian, 0.2% Asian, 0.1% Native Hawaiian/Pacific Islander, 8.2% were some other race, and 2.8% two or more races.

In March 2012, unemployment was at 16.2%, which is the same percent it was in November 2010.

Religion

Most Aguadillanos are Christian with a majority being Roman Catholic. Like most cities in Puerto Rico Aguadilla has their Catholic church located on the main square in their downtown. There is also a significant community of Protestants including Pentecostals, Adventists and Jehovah's Witnesses. Aguadilla has an Islamic community with and Islamic Center located on PR-111 in Palmar barrio.

Government

City

All municipalities in Puerto Rico are administered by a mayor, elected every four years. The current mayor of Aguadilla is Julio Roldán Concepción, of the Popular Democratic Party (PPD).

State
Most state agencies are based at the Government Center Building with the exception of the Corporación del Seguro del Estado (State Insurance Agency) and the Centro de Servicios al Conductor (Driver's Services Center). Most state agencies left their offices after the Senatorial District was taken away from Aguadilla.

Public safety
Aguadilla has its own police department, Policía Municipal Aguadilla (Aguadilla City Police Department), located in Aguadilla Pueblo. The A.C.P.D. only has jurisdiction in the municipality of Aguadilla and provide service and protection to local citizens and travelers alike.

Aguadilla also hosts the Puerto Rico Police Department Command for its Region. This region covers Aguada, Aguadilla, Isabela, Moca, Rincón and San Sebastián. It also hosts the PRPD Highway Patrol Division for its region, the FURA Division of the PRPD, the US Army Reserve Center, PR National Guard, U.S. Coast Guard, and the Border Patrol. It is also served by another PRPD station in San Antonio Village (Precinct 203 Ramey-San Antonio).

The city has a single correctional facility, Guerrero Correctional Institution, operated by the Puerto Rico Department of Corrections and Rehabilitation.

In recent years, Aguadilla has seen an increase in Type I crimes, which include murder, burglary, and theft.

FBI satellite office
There is an FBI satellite office located in Aguadilla.

Mayors

Senate
The city belongs to the Puerto Rico Senatorial district IV, which is represented by two Senators. In 2016, Evelyn Vázquez and Luis Daniel Muñiz were elected as District Senators.

Symbols
The municipio has an official flag and coat of arms.

Flag
The flag consists of two horizontal stripes of equal size. The upper one is blue and the lower gold, which are the predominant colors in the shield, which is placed in the center of it.

Coat of arms
Based on a design by Alberto Vadi, the coat of arms was organized by Herman Reichard Esteves and José J. Santa-Pinter under the direction of the Aguadilla municipal administration and was approved by the municipal assembly on June 29, 1972.

Education

Public schools
In all of the island's municipalities, public education is overseen by the Puerto Rico Department of Education. Aguadilla hosts the Head Start Program for Aguadilla, Aguada, Moca, Rincón, and San Sebastián and a number of private institutions.

As of 2018-2019 the following public schools were operational in Aguadilla:
 Ana M. Javariz is a rural elementary school located in Urb. El Prado offering grades K-6 with about 215 students.
 Antonio Badillo Hernández is a rural, elementary school located in Montaña offering grades K–6 with about 327 students.
 Homero Rivera Sola is a rural elementary school located in Corrales barrio offering grades K–6 with about 153 students.
 José de Diego is a rural elementary school located in Res. José de Diego offering grades K–6 with about 242 students.
 Luis Muñoz Rivera is a rural elementary school located in Camaseyes barrio offering grades K–6 with about 206 students.
 Antonio Badillo Hernandez is a rural intermediate school located in Montaña barrio offering grades 7–9 with about 336 students.
 Ester Feliciano Mendoza is a rural intermediate school offering grades 6–8 with about 416 students.
 Benito Cerezo Vázquez is a rural high school located in Borinquen barrio offering grades 10–12 with about 435 students.
 Juan Suárez Pelegrina is a rural high school located in Montaña barrio offering grades 10–12 with about 715 students.
 Salvador Fuentes is a rural high school located in Ramey base offering grades 10–12 with about 288 students.
 Centro de Adiestramiento y Bellas Artes (CABA) is a school that specializes in the arts located in Ramey base. In 2016, it served about 500 students.
 Su Conchita Igartua de Suárez is a rural elementary school offering grades PreK–8, with about 768 students.

Higher education
Aguadilla hosts the following universities:
 Puerto Rico Aviation Maintenance Institute 
 Aeronautical and Aerospace Institute of Puerto Rico (AAIPR)
 University of Puerto Rico at Aguadilla
 Metropolitan University, Aguadilla Campus
 Interamerican University of Puerto Rico, Aguadilla Campus
 Automeca Technical College
 Puerto Rico Criminal Justice College, Aguadilla Campus (Puerto Rico Police Academy) Ramey Job Corps also serves those who want to attain a higher education.

Aguadilla Library System
There is a digital library in San Antonio Village and another in downtown Aguadilla (Aguadilla barrio-pueblo).

Health
There are two major medical facilities in Aguadilla.
 Hospital Buen Samaritano (Good Samaritan Hospital)
 Aguadilla Medical Services
 Sala de Urgencias San Francisco (road#2)
 Metro Pavia Clinic Aguadilla

Transportation

Air
Rafael Hernández Airport is located in the city of Aguadilla. In recent years, it has seen a resurgence as an international airport in the island, with several airlines planning flights to the US from Aguadilla.

Roads
Interstate PR-2 (Rafael Henández Highway). Plans are underway for a new expressway, an expansion to existing Puerto Rico Highway 22 (José de Diego Expressway) from Hatillo and it will probably end at Puerto Rico Highway 111.
There are 13 bridges in Aguadilla.

Notable people from Aguadilla

Gallery

See also

History of Puerto Rico
List of Puerto Ricans
National Register of Historic Places listings in Aguadilla, Puerto Rico

References

Further reading

External links 

 Aguadilla and its barrios, United States Census Bureau
 Official Government Page of Municipality of Aguadilla
 Map of Aguadilla Puerto Rico
 Porta del Sol: Aguadilla

Municipalities of Puerto Rico
Aguadilla–Isabela–San Sebastián metropolitan area
Populated places established in 1775
1775 establishments in the Spanish West Indies
1770s establishments in Puerto Rico